"I've Lost You" is a song written by Alan Blaikley and Ken Howard (under the pen name 'Steve Barlby') for Iain Matthews. It was originally recorded in 1969 and released on Matthews' first solo album after leaving Fairport Convention: Matthews' Southern Comfort.

Elvis Presley recording
"I've Lost You" was covered by Elvis Presley. It was released in July 1970, debuted at number 85 on the Hot 100 on 1 August 1970, and reached number 32 on 29 August – 5 September 1970.  On the Cash Box chart, however, it reached as high as number 18.  It also charted at number five on the Adult Contemporary chart. The song became a gold record.

As a newly released single, Presley included it in his setlist during his third Las Vegas season (August/September 1970) and the version from 12 August Dinner Show was included in the MGM movie Elvis: That's the Way It Is.

In Canada, "I've Lost You" was a Top 10 hit. It peaked at number 10, and spent two weeks in that position. It was also a top 10 hit in the United Kingdom where Presley's career was on something of a major resurgence, reaching number 9 for two weeks in November and December.

The song might be seen as reflecting the state of Elvis' marriage to Priscilla at the time it was recorded (4 June 1970).

Chart performance

References

External links
 

Elvis Presley songs
1970 songs
1970 singles
RCA Victor singles
Songs written by Alan Blaikley
Songs written by Ken Howard (composer)
Iain Matthews songs